For the song by Harold Arden and Ted Koehler, see When the Sun Comes Out

When Sun Comes Out is an album by the American Jazz musician Sun Ra and his Myth Science Arkestra. The album was originally released on Ra's own record label, Saturn, in 1963, and was the fifth album by the Arkestra to be put out, after Jazz by Sun Ra (1957), Super-Sonic Jazz (also 1957), Jazz in Silhouette (1959) and The Futuristic Sounds of Sun Ra (1961). The album was the first Saturn release to be taken from recordings made at the Choreographer's Workshop, New York. Other albums recorded there include Art Forms of Dimensions Tomorrow, Bad and Beautiful, Cosmic Tones for Mental Therapy and Other Planes of There.
'The New York period saw Ra focusing far more on percussion backdrops as opposed to horn arrangements (virtually everyone on the album gets a percussion credit), and everything from the percussion to the horn solos to Ra's piano playing took a more aggressive stance. John Gilmore's tenor solo on "Calling Planet Earth" throws the bop rule book out the window, and he is heard developing a more extended vocabulary of skronks and squeals. This track exemplifies the change in sound and focus from the Chicago days.... When Sun Comes Out is a first glimpse into an era that would culminate in some of the Arkestra's most renowned recordings.' Sean Westergaard 
When reissued on Compact disc by Evidence in 1993, When Sun Comes Out was appended to the slightly earlier Fate In A Pleasant Mood.

Track listing

12" Vinyl
All songs by Sun Ra
Side A:
"Circe" - (2.34)
"The Nile" - (4.51)
"Brazilian Sun" - (3.50)
"We Travel The Spaceways" - (3.21)
Side B:
"Calling Planet Earth" - (5.30)
"Dancing Shadows" - (5.56)
"The Rainmaker" - (4.33)
"When Sun Comes Out" - (4.54)

Musicians 
Sun Ra - Piano, Electric Celeste, Percussion
Walter Miller - Trumpet
John Gilmore - Tenor Sax, Drums, Percussion, Percussion
Teddy Nance - Trombone
Bernard Pettaway - Trombone
Marshall Allen - Flute, Alto Saxophone, Percussion
Pat Patrick - Baritone Saxophone, Bongos, Drums on We Travel The Spaceways
Danny Davis - Alto Sax
Ronnie Boykins - Bass
Clifford Jarvis - Drums
Lex Humphries - Drums on Calling Planet Earth
Tommy Hunter - Gong, Drums, Tape Effects
Theda Barbara - Vocals
Ensemble vocals

Recorded entirely at the Choreographer's Workshop, New York (the Arkestra's rehearsal space) in late 1962 or 1963.

Notes

Sun Ra albums
1963 albums
El Saturn Records albums
Evidence Music albums